Hanmer Mere is a natural lake and Site of Special Scientific Interest in Wrexham County Borough, Wales. The village of Hanmer is at the northern end of the lake.

See also
List of Sites of Special Scientific Interest in Clwyd

References

Sites of Special Scientific Interest in Clwyd
Bodies of water of Wrexham County Borough